Home is a 2016 American horror drama film directed by Frank Lin, starring Heather Langenkamp and Samantha Mumba.

Plot
A religious young woman (Carrie) has difficulty coping when her mother decides to come out as a lesbian and marry an atheist woman. After her parents leave on a business trip, she discovers that their house is haunted by evil and must save herself and her little stepsister (Tia).

Cast
 

 Heather Langenkamp as Heather
 Samantha Mumba as Samantha
 Kerry Knuppe as Carrie
 Aaron Hill as Aaron
 Alessandra Shelby Farmer as Tia
 Lew Temple as Lew

Release 
Home was released as VOD and DVD in Region 1 by Inception Group Media on March 1, 2016.

References

External links
 
 

2016 films
2016 direct-to-video films
2016 horror films
2016 LGBT-related films
2010s thriller films
American horror drama films
American haunted house films
American supernatural horror films
American independent films
Lesbian-related films
LGBT-related horror films
2016 drama films
2010s English-language films
2010s American films